Min Kwon (born Kwon, Min-Kyung) is a Korean-American pianist and professor of piano at the Mason Gross School of the Arts at Rutgers University.

Early life and education
Kwon began playing the piano at the age of three under the tutelage of her mother, who ran a music school out of her home.  She also studied violin, cello, and choral singing, but in sixth grade she decided to focus fully on piano. She received the Music Award from the Korean Department of Education at the age of 12 and made her debut as piano soloist with the Korean Symphony in Mendelssohn's Concerto No. 1, and performing Saint-Saëns Concerto No. 2 with the Seoul Philharmonic.   

Her family immigrated to Closter, New Jersey when she was 14. There, she received a full scholarship to study at the Curtis Institute of Music in Philadelphia, and made her North American debut with the Philadelphia Orchestra at the age of 16, performing the Prokofiev Concerto No. 3.  While at Curtis, she studied with Eleanor Sokoloff and Leon Fleisher, and participated in the master classes of such artists as Richard Goode and Murray Perahia.  

After earning her Bachelor of Music degree at the age of 19, Kwon continued her studies at The Juilliard School with Martin Canin.  She received MM and DMA degrees from Juilliard, and completed post-doctoral studies at the University of Mozarteum in Austria with Hanz Leygraf.

Career
Kwon and her sister Yoon modeled for a Pantene shampoo TV commercial in 2001.

She has written articles in Korean music publications, most notably Piano Music, in which she interviewed such pianists as Kristjan Zimmerman, Yevgeny Kissin, Leif Ove Andsnes, Mitsuko Uchida, Murray Perhaia, and Pierre Laurent Aimard.

Music 
As the winner of the Beethoven Competition, Kwon made her New York debut in 1992 with the Juilliard Orchestra at the Avery Fisher Hall of Lincoln Center under Stanisław Skrowaczewski, performing Beethoven's Concerto No. 4. She later toured South America with Orquesta Estaudo Mexico and Orquesta Sinforinca Venezuela, and appeared with all the major orchestras in Korea.

Kwon and her sister, violinist Yoon Kwon, were the first Koreans to record for RCA Red Seal Records in 1996.  Between 1994 and 2000, the duo performed extensively under the (Columbia Artists Management) Community Concerts and IMG Artists Management.  In addition to the duo album, Kwon has recorded solo piano works featured in You and Me and Concerto Extravaganza. Her latest solo album was released in 2008 by MSR Classics, featuring the music of Schubert and Liszt, and was a collaboration with producer David Frost.

Kwon has given solo and chamber recitals in Seoul, Singapore, Sydney, and at New York's Carnegie Weill Recital Hall, and has performed on numerous international stages, including the Colmar Festival in France, in Germany, Estonia, Norway, Malaysia, Curaçao, and Switzerland.  

Kwon served as Co‐Director of Vienna ConcertoFest in Austria. From 2015 until 2018 she served on the Juilliard School Council in New York, the first music alumna to have been invited to do so.

Teaching 
Kwon became a professor of Piano at the Mason Gross School in 2002.

Kwon has been invited to teach at the Kuhmo Chamber Music Festival in Finland, and the Altenburg MozartFest in Austria. She has conducted master classes at Shanghai Conservatory, Beijing Central Conservatory, Hong Kong Academy of Fine Arts, Hong Kong University, Yong Siew Toh Conservatory of Singapore, and the Vladimir Feltsman PianoFest in SUNY New Paltz, New York. 

She has served as a guest professor at London Royal College of Music and the International Keyboard Institute in Korea. During the summer of 2017, she was the Artist in Residence at American Academy in Rome and taught at Music Fest Perugia.  At Rutgers, she has tutored over 40 doctoral pianists from 18 nationalities.

She has served as Chair of Keyboard Studies and Interim Director of the Music Department, and taught piano minor and chamber music at The Juilliard School in New York.

Arts advocacy 
In 2010, Kwon founded the nonprofit The Center for Musical Excellence, which provides training and assistance to gifted young musicians wishing to pursue a life in music. CME provides grants, mentorships, and performances. Kwon currently serves as Executive and Artistic Director of the organization.

In 2021 Kwon launched the America/Beautiful project, which combined performances of different compositions of "America the Beautiful" with conversations around American history and identity. The project was included in an episode of the PBS series State of the Arts.

Personal life 
Kwon has traveled to over 60 countries. As of 2021, she lives in Bedminster, New Jersey, where she is a member of the Lamington Presbyterian Church.

Kwon is married to Leonard Lee, who is chairman of surgery at Robert Wood Johnson University Hospital. The couple have two daughters.

Awards
She is the winner of Juilliard's Gina Bachauer International Piano Award (1995), the Kingsville International Competition, Van Cliburn Institute Competition, and won prizes at the Jaen International, Scottish International, Dong-A International, and Calabria International Piano Competitions. She won the Grand Prize at the Korea KBS Emerging Artists Awards.

Since 1996, Kwon is also the highest rated classical artist onboard Crystal Cruises, and was twice named their Classical Artist of the Year (2002 and 2005). She was also seen on the Hour of Power with Robert Schuller,  and was featured as the cover story, "Maestro on Mediterranean," of Virtuoso Magazine.

In 2010 she won the Dorthy McKenzie Award at the New York Keyboard Institute and Festival.

Discography

 1996  Yoon Kwon, Min Kwon / Min Kwon (works by Part, Brahms, de Falla, Gershwin, Kreisler)
 2000  You and Me, Yoon and Min (works by Chopin, Rachmaninoff, Copland, Schonfield)
 2005  Concerto Extravaganza (works by Bach, Mozart, Beethoven, Mendelssohn, Chopin, Grieg, Rachmaninoff)
 2008  Schubert and Liszt (Schubert Sonata D 850, Schubert/Liszt Gretchen am Spinnrade, Liszt Gnomenreigen, Reminiscence de Don Juan)
 2010  Franz Schubert: Music for Piano Four Hands (with Robert Lehrbaumer)
 2015  CME Presents: Piano Celebration Vol. I (works by Horowitz, Barber, Rachmaninoff, Brahms, Rzewski)
 2016  CME Presents: Piano Celebration Vol. II (works by Paul Real for four hands)
 2019 Dance!

References

External links
 Official website
  at Mason Gross School, Rutgers University

American classical pianists
American women classical pianists
Living people
Juilliard School alumni
Year of birth missing (living people)
American classical musicians of Korean descent
21st-century classical pianists
21st-century American women pianists
21st-century American pianists